Conus victoriae, common name the Queen Victoria cone, is a species of sea snail, a marine gastropod mollusk in the family Conidae, the cone snails and their allies.

Like all species within the genus Conus, these snails are predatory and venomous. They are capable of "stinging" humans, therefore live ones should be handled carefully or not at all.

Taxonomy
Conus nodulosus has often been treated as a geographical variant or subspecies of C. victoriae. They have a disjunct distribution, the latter occurring from Exmouth to the Western Australia / Northern Territory border, whereas nodulosus has a distribution restricted from Geraldton to Calbary and the Abrolhos. For conservation implications, the two are here listed as distinct.

Description
Conus victoriae is a mollusc-eating cone (molluscivore) possibly related to Conus textile . It differs from Conus textile in the reticulations. These are mostly smaller, arid light-colored, contrasting strongly with the bands of very dark chocolate longitudinal stripes. They are also more or less overlaid with violaceous clouds.

A component of its venom, alpha conotoxin Vc1.1 (ACV1) has been shown to be a potent analgesic in pain tests in animals and is a potential replacement for morphine for the treatment of neuropathic pain.

The biology of this cone species has been extensively studied, in particular the embryonic development of its venom apparatus, the expression of the venom gland proteome and the role of the venom bulb in delivery of venom components to the radulae.

Distribution
This marine species is endemic to Australia (Western Australia from Broome north to the mouth of the Victoria River, Northern Territory where it was first discovered by Reeve in 1843)

Gallery

References

 Reeve, L.A. 1843. Descriptions of new species of shells figured in the 'Conchologia Iconica'. Proceedings of the Zoological Society of London 11: 169–197
 Reeve, L.A. 1843. Monograph of the genus Conus. pls 1–39 in Reeve, L.A. (ed.). Conchologica Iconica. London : L. Reeve & Co. Vol. 1. 
 Sowerby, G.B. 1866. Thesaurus Conchyliorum, or monographs of genera of shells. London : G.B. Sowerby Vol. 3 277–331 pls 266–290.
 Wilson, B.R. & Gillett, K. 1971. Australian Shells: illustrating and describing 600 species of marine gastropods found in Australian waters. Sydney : Reed Books 168 pp.
 Wilson, B. 1994. Australian Marine Shells. Prosobranch Gastropods. Kallaroo, WA : Odyssey Publishing Vol. 2 370 pp. 
 Röckel, D., Korn, W. & Kohn, A.J. 1995. Manual of the Living Conidae. Volume 1: Indo-Pacific Region. Wiesbaden : Hemmen 517 pp.
 Petit, R. E. (2009). George Brettingham Sowerby, I, II & III: their conchological publications and molluscan taxa. Zootaxa. 2189: 1–218

External links
 The Conus Biodiversity website
 Cone Shell and Conotoxins website
 Pain Killer Comes out of its Shell – The Age 25 July 2005
 Internet Interview with Bruce Livett
 Nervous System – Cone Snail Toxin from Untamed Science
 Cone Shells – Knights of the Sea
 

victoriae
Gastropods of Australia
Gastropods described in 1843